Thing T. Thing, often referred to as just Thing, is a fictional character in The Addams Family series. The Addamses called it "Thing" because it was something that could not be identified. It is known as "Cosa" (Thing) in Spain, "Dedos" (Fingers) in Hispanic America, "Mano" (Hand) in Italy ,"La Chose" (the Thing) in French speaking countries, and "eiskaltes Händchen" (icecold hand) in  German.

Appearances

In The Addams Family media
Thing was the creation of Charles Addams, who drew the Addams Family cartoons in The New Yorker magazine, beginning in the 1930s. He first appeared in Addams's 1954 book Homebodies. One of Addams cartoons shows the Addams mansion with a sign at the front saying "Beware of the Thing". Additionally, Thing has been in the original television series (1964–66), the revived series The New Addams Family (1998), in the related films The Addams Family (1991), Addams Family Values (1993) and Addams Family Reunion (1998), the 1992 animated series, and Wednesday (2022 television series).

In the 1960s television series, Thing—strictly speaking, a disembodied forearm, since it occasionally emerged from its box at near-elbow length—was usually played by Ted Cassidy, who also played the lugubrious butler Lurch. The two characters occasionally appeared in the same scene (in which case Thing would be played by a crew member, notably assistant director Jack Voglin). Thing customarily emerged from a series of boxes, one in each room in the Addams' mansion, and the mailbox outside. It occasionally emerged from behind a curtain, within a plant pot, the family wall safe, or elsewhere.

In many scenes he lay on his back on a wheeled trolley, below the line of sight of the cameras, and inserted his arm through the bottom of the box. Thing was usually a right hand, but Cassidy sometimes played it as left, simply to see if anyone would notice. Thing is credited as "Itself" at the end of each episode.

In the later films, thanks to advances in special effects, Thing (played by Christopher Hart's hand) is able to emerge and run on its fingertips, much like a spider. In Addams Family Values, Thing is shown driving a car into Debbie in order to rescue Uncle Fester. After this, Fester gets into the car and Thing drives them off to the Addams Family Mansion, albeit erratically, frightening Fester in the process. This is also true for the 1998 series The New Addams Family where Thing was played by the hand of Canadian magician/actor Steven Fox. Its classic box only appears in one episode of the series (the remake of "Thing's Romance"); in others, it is revealed that he lives in a closet that has been modified as its own "house-within-a-house".

In the musical, Thing only appears in the beginning, when he opens the curtain. He is played by a member of the ensemble. In the tour version, Pugsley carries Thing on a pillow at Wednesday and Lucas's wedding while Thing holds the ring.

Thing appears in the 2019 animated film. He appears as a disembodied hand and wears a watch with an eye on it (perhaps used to see) in some scenes, he is also shown to have a foot fetish. Thing also appears in the 2021 animated film sequel, again with a "watch" with an eye, which is used at various times to express Thing's feelings, such as exasperation with an eye roll.

Thing appears in the 2022 live-action Netflix original series Wednesday, portrayed by Victor Dorobantu's hand. This version is shown to have stitches on him.  Gomez puts him in charge of watching over Wednesday while she attends Nevermore Academy, only for Wednesday to force him to help her with solving the mysteries of the school and the town of Jericho.

In other media
In December 2021, Thing appeared in advertisements for British furniture retailer DFS, as part of their "find your thing" campaign.

Role in the series

Thing's many useful roles included fetching the mail, handing cigars to Gomez Addams and then lighting them, changing the channel on the Addams TV set, holding Morticia Addams's wool while she knits, turning grapes into wine in under a single minute, and turning over records on the phonograph (particularly when Gomez and Morticia dance the tango). It accompanies the family on drives by riding in the glove compartment, and in one episode, where Gomez appears in court, it emerged from Gomez's briefcase. Thing and Grandmama are fond of arm-wrestling. In a flashback episode on how Gomez and Morticia met, it is revealed that Thing has been with the Addams family since Gomez himself was a child, suggesting Thing is the son of an earlier generation of hand-servants (see below). Thing, overall, acts as the straight man of the show.

Morticia is always very appreciative of Thing's services, and her frequent "Thank you, Thing" is one of the best known lines of the series; Wednesday takes after her mother in courteously expressing gratitude for Thing's assistance, also. Thing cannot talk, but it does sometimes snap its fingers to attract attention, and is also able to communicate by signaling in Morse code, writing, or with the help of the manual alphabet. This can be very disconcerting to visitors to the Addams' mansion; in a running gag in some episodes, a visitor to the Addams home, profusely grateful for some kindness of the Addamses', enthusiastically shakes hands with everyone present—"Thank you, Mr. Addams! Thank you, Mrs. Addams!"—and is then offered a handshake by Thing. "And thank you..." begins the visitor, before realizing who and what he has been confronted with, recoiling in inarticulate shock, and fleeing the premises.

In one episode, Morticia gets goosed, and initially suspects Thing, who had been nearby moments earlier. However, Gomez immediately appears and admits responsibility, explaining: "Thing just likes to hold hands".

Other hands
On the 1960s TV series, two similar hands were introduced in the episode "Morticia Meets Royalty":

 Lady Fingers: A female "handmaiden" who was the servant of Aunt Millie, also known as Princess Millicent von Schlepp. When Millicent came to visit, Thing and Lady Fingers fell in love. Lady Fingers later returned in Halloween with the New Addams Family, as the handmaiden of Granny Frump and the 1998 series revival, as the handmaiden of Cousin Pretensia.
 Esmerelda: Another female hand hired by Millicent after firing Lady Fingers. Esmerelda turned out to be a thief and Millicent rehires Lady Fingers.

In the episode "Thing Is Missing", Gomez and Morticia find a portrait of Thing's parents, a male hand and a female hand. The 1990s revived series implied the existence of other hands as well.

References

External links
 Article at TV ACRES
 Unofficial episode guide to the 1960s series
 Unofficial episode guide to the revived series

The Addams Family characters
Comics characters introduced in 1954
Comics characters with superhuman strength
Fictional characters who can move at superhuman speeds